was an  destroyer of the Imperial Japanese Navy. Her name means "Moon Visible as Day Joins Evening". She was commissioned too late to see action in World War II. Following the war, the ship was handed over to the Republic of China and renamed Fen Yang.

Design and description
The Akizuki-class ships were originally designed as anti-aircraft escorts for carrier battle groups, but were modified with torpedo tubes and depth charges to meet the need for more general-purpose destroyer. Her crew numbered 300 officers and enlisted men.

The ship had two Kampon geared steam turbines, each driving one propeller shaft, using steam provided by three Kampon water-tube boilers.

The main armament of the Akizuki class consisted of eight Type 98  dual purpose guns in four twin-gun turrets, two superfiring pairs fore and aft of the superstructure. They carried four Type 96  anti-aircraft guns in two twin-gun mounts. The ships were also armed with four  torpedo tubes in a single quadruple traversing mount; one reload was carried for each tube. Their anti-submarine weapons comprised six depth charge throwers for which 72 depth charges were carried.

Construction and career
In March, 1946, Yoizuki was used to transport over 1,000 Formosans, Filipinos and Japanese prisoners of war from Sydney, Australia. The conditions aboard ship and the obvious distress of the repatriates prompted controversy in Australia. On 29 August 1947, Yoizuki was turned over to the Republic of China. Renamed CNS Fen Yang, she was scrapped in 1963.

Notes

References

External links
 CombinedFleet.com: Akizuki-class destroyers
 CombinedFleet.com: Yoizuki history

Akizuki-class destroyers (1942)
World War II destroyers of Japan
1944 ships
Destroyers of the Republic of China Navy